Martin Smith (born 2 October 1995) is an English footballer who plays as a midfielder for South Shields.

Career
Smith began his career with Sunderland and had a loan spell with non-league Gateshead in November 2015. In March 2016 Smith joined League Two side Carlisle United on loan until the end of the 2015–16 season. He made his professional debut on 19 March 2016 in a 1–1 draw against Wycombe Wanderers.

On 24 June 2016, Smith signed for Scottish Premiership club Kilmarnock.

After a season at Kilmarnock, Smith signed for NIFL Premiership club Coleraine. In July 2018, he joined Swindon Town, following a recommendation from assistant manager Neil McDonald, who had been managing in Ireland while Smith was at Coleraine.

He was released by Swindon at the end of the 2018–19 season.

In July 2019 he joined Salford City on a two-year contract. In November he joined Chorley on loan until January 2020. On 11 January 2021, it was announced that Smith had left Salford City by mutual consent.

On 14 January 2021, Smith signed for National League side Chesterfield.

On 16 July 2021, Smith signed for Hartlepool United. Smith was released by Pools at the end of the 2021–22 season. He made 15 appearances in all competitions for the League Two side.

On 1 June 2022, Smith signed for South Shields.

Career statistics

Honours
Coleraine
Irish Cup: 2017-18

References

External links

1995 births
Living people
Footballers from Sunderland
English footballers
Sunderland A.F.C. players
Gateshead F.C. players
Carlisle United F.C. players
Kilmarnock F.C. players
Coleraine F.C. players
Swindon Town F.C. players
Salford City F.C. players
Chorley F.C. players
Chesterfield F.C. players
Hartlepool United F.C. players
South Shields F.C. (1974) players
Association football midfielders
National League (English football) players
English Football League players
Scottish Professional Football League players
NIFL Premiership players
Northern Premier League players